St Kilda Football Club is a club from Melbourne, Australia.

AFL home and away seasons 
The St Kilda Football Club has fared well since the league became known as the AFL prior to the start of the 1990 premiership season (formerly the VFL – first season 1897). The team have made the finals series eleven times. St Kilda finished second in both 1997 and 2009 after qualifying for the finals series in first position and winning the minor premierships.  They were eliminated in preliminary finals in 2004, 2005 and 2008.

The club has also played in 5 Pre-Season Cup finals, winning 3 (1996, 2004, 2008) and losing 2 (1998, 2010).

Bold text indicates that the club qualified for the finals series in that year.

AFL finals series 

St Kilda Football Club's finals series records since the league changed its name to the AFL:

AFL pre-season cups 

St Kilda Football Club's pre-season cup records:

Statistics do not include 1988 to 1992 as data is not available.
^ One win in the pre-season cup was a forfeit by Essendon after they failed to arrive for the game within the designated allowable time.

Most goals
Most goals kicked by a player while playing with St Kilda Football Club.

Record home game attendances 
In home and away season games:

Records set in 2010 are in bold.

Record away game attendances 
Record crowds when St Kilda were the away team in the club's home city of Melbourne for matches in home and away season games:

Record crowds when St Kilda were the away team against teams based outside the state of Victoria in home and away season games:

Records set in 2010 are in bold.

Record scores

Highest scores
Record highest scores against each opponent:

Lowest scores
Record lowest scores against each opponent:

Lowest scores since 1919
Lowest post-1919 scores against all pre-1919 opponents except University (who disbanded in 1915):

Record winning margins 
Record winning margins in the Australian Football League (formerly the Victorian Football League established 1897).

Records set in 2010 are in bold.

 Most club best and fairest awards: 5 Nick Riewoldt (2002, 2004, 2006–07, 2009)
 Most consecutive games: 123 Ian Synman (1961–1968)
 Most seasons as leading goalkicker: 12 Bill Mohr (1929–1940)
 Most goals: 898 Tony Lockett (1983–1994)
 Most goals in a season: 132 Tony Lockett (1992)
 Most goals kicked in a game: 15 Tony Lockett (1992, v Sydney Swans)
 Most games: 383 Robert Harvey (1988–2008)
 Most matches as coach: 332 Allan Jeans (1961–1976)

Notes

References

External links 
 St Kilda Football Club official website

Records and statistics
Australian rules football-related lists

ca:Saint Kilda Football Club
it:St.Kilda Football Club
pl:St Kilda Football Club
simple:St Kilda Football Club